Imvume Holdings is a South African oil company. It shot to fame in 2005 as a result of its involvement in what the South African press has dubbed the Oilgate scandal.

In 2004, the investigation South African newspaper Mail & Guardian revealed Imvume's implication in the United Nations Oil-for-Food scandal. Imvume was named as one of the companies that paid kickbacks to Iraq in exchange for a contract under the oil for food program. Imvume has since taken legal action against the Independent Inquiry Committee, the UN body that made the accusations. The court case is ongoing.

See also
Chancellor House Holdings

References

Oil and gas companies of South Africa